In Greek mythology, the name Epochus may refer to:

Epochus, an Arcadian prince as son of King Lycurgus of Arcadia and Cleophyle or Eurynome or Antinoe, and thus the brother of Ancaeus, Amphidamas and Iasus. Epochus participated in the Calydonian boar hunt together with his brother Ancaeus: Pausanias describes a painting in the Tegean temple of Athena Alea, which portrays, among others, Epochus supporting Ancaeus who had been wounded by the boar. Later on, Epochus fell ill and died, and was outlived by their father Lycurgus who reached an extreme old age.
Epochus, one of the two brothers of Oenoe (the eponym of a deme in Attica) that were portrayed on the altar of Nemesis in Rhamnous.

Notes

References 

 Pausanias, Description of Greece with an English Translation by W.H.S. Jones, Litt.D., and H.A. Ormerod, M.A., in 4 Volumes. Cambridge, MA, Harvard University Press; London, William Heinemann Ltd. 1918. . Online version at the Perseus Digital Library
 Pausanias, Graeciae Descriptio. 3 vols. Leipzig, Teubner. 1903.  Greek text available at the Perseus Digital Library.
 Pseudo-Apollodorus, The Library with an English Translation by Sir James George Frazer, F.B.A., F.R.S. in 2 Volumes, Cambridge, MA, Harvard University Press; London, William Heinemann Ltd. 1921. . Online version at the Perseus Digital Library. Greek text available from the same website.

Attican characters in Greek mythology
Arcadian mythology